Rhyme & Reason is a 1997 documentary film about rap and hip hop. Documentary filmmaker Peter Spirer interviewed over 80 significant artists in rap and hip hop music. The film explores the history of hip hop culture, how rap evolved to become a major cultural voice (and a multi-billion dollar industry), and what the artists have to say about the music's often controversial images and reputation. Interview subjects range from veteran old-school rappers, such as Kurtis Blow, KRS-One and Chuck D, to rap icons Ice-T, Dr. Dre, and MC Eiht, to several current rap hitmakers, including Wu-Tang Clan, Tupac Shakur, and The Notorious B.I.G., less than four days before he was murdered.

The film was released to 280 theaters, earning $1,608,277 during its theatrical run.

On November 25, 2021, Rolling Stone published an article titled '70 Greatest Music Documentaries of All Time'; Rhyme & Reason was ranked 35th.

Subject matter
The following artists were interviewed in the documentary:
B-Real
Biz Markie
Busta Rhymes
Chuck D
Chuco
Craig Mack
Cypress Hill
Da Brat
Delinquent Habits
DJ Muggs
DJ Scratch
Dr. Dre
E-40
Erick Sermon
Fatlip
Grandmaster Caz
Guru
Heavy D
Keith Murray
Kris Kross
KRS-One
Kurtis Blow
Ice-T
Jermaine Dupri
Lauryn Hill
Lords of the Underground
Lost Boyz
Little Cesar
L.V.
Master P
Mr. Animation
Method Man
Nas
The Pharcyde
Phife Dawg
PMD
Pras
Tupac Shakur
The Notorious B.I.G.
Mack 10
Q-Tip
Raekwon
Ras Kass
Redman
RZA
Salt-n-Pepa
Sean "Puffy" Combs
Spearhead
Speech
Tha Alkaholiks
Too Short
Tray Deee
Treach
Whodini
Wu-Tang Clan
Wyclef Jean
Xzibit
Young MC
Yukmouth

Soundtrack

References

"Rhyme & Reason: Hip-Hop history", SF Gate
Mark Deming, All Movie Guide

External links
 
 
 

1997 films
American documentary films
Documentary films about hip hop music and musicians
1990s English-language films
1990s American films